Bon Appetit is the third studio album released by American rapper and D.I.T.C. member O.C. It was released on April 24, 2001 via JCOR Entertainment.

Track listing

Charts

References

O.C. (rapper) albums
2001 albums
Albums produced by Buckwild
Albums produced by Lord Finesse